Who Has Seen the Wind may refer to:

Who Has Seen the Wind (novel), 1947 novel by Canadian author W. O. Mitchell
Who Has Seen the Wind?, American TV production directed by George Sidney; produced by the United Nations
"Who Has Seen the Wind?" (song), by Yoko Ono
Who Has Seen the Wind (1977 film), Canadian production based on W. O. Mitchell's novel